Khoda Box Mridha (22 January 1945 – 30 March 2010) was a Bangladeshi sports commentator, player, and sports organizer.

Early life and education
Mridha passed his matriculation examination from Rajshahi Muslim Higher Secondary School in 1961 and the intermediate examination in 1963 from Rajshahi College. He completed his bachelor's and master's from Rajshahi University in political science.

Career
Mridha started his career in 1968 as a lecturer in the Department of Political Science at Murari Chand College. He then worked as a teacher in Rajshahi New Government Degree College, Rajshahi Government Women College, Rajshahi Government City College, and Rajshahi Government College. He retired from the teaching profession in 2003.

Mridha served as an executive member of Bangladesh Cricket Board. 

In 1972, he made his debut as a commentator at a friendly match between Kolkata East Bengal and Rajshahi District Football team.

Death
Mridha had been suffering from typhoid followed by pneumonia before his death on 30 March 2010 in Rajshahi.

References

1945 births
2010 deaths
People from Rajshahi District
University of Rajshahi alumni
Bangladeshi cricket commentators
Bangladeshi association football commentators